Fintan O'Connor is an Irish hurling manager, coach and selector. He has been the manager of the senior Kerry county hurling team since 2016.

Born in Kilcullen, County Kildare, O'Connor grew up with an association with rugby union. He managed Waterpark RFC before becoming involved with various hurling teams at Blackwater Community School. O'Connor later served as manager of the Fourmilewater team before guiding Cappoquin to Munster success in the intermediate grade in 2014. That same year he was part of the Waterford Institute of Technology Fitzgibbon Cup-winning management team. O'Connor spent two years as a selector with the Waterford senior team, helping the team to a National Hurling League title in 2015.

He was appointed manager of the senior Kerry county hurling team in January 2016.

Honours

Manager
Cappoquin
Munster Intermediate Club Hurling Championship (1): 2014
Waterford Intermediate Hurling Championship (1): 2014

Kerry

All-Ireland Under-21 B Hurling Championship (1): 2017
All-Ireland Under-20 B Hurling Championship (2): 2018, 2019

Selector
Waterford Institute of Technology
Fitzgibbon Cup (1): 2014

Waterford
National Hurling League (1): 2015

References

Living people
Hurling coaches
Hurling managers
Hurling selectors
Waterford IT hurlers
Year of birth missing (living people)